Royal Consort Sin of the Paju Yeom clan was the 6th wife of King Gongmin of Goryeo.

Biography

Marriage and Palace life
In 28 November 1371 (20th year reign of King Gongmin of Goryeo), she was honoured as Sin-Bi (신비, 愼妃). As they didn't have any issue, in 1372 (21st year of King Gongmin), he selected some young and handsome men and then ordered Han-An (한안) and Hong-Ryun (홍륜) from the Self-Defense Committee to have a sex with his consorts. After King Gongmin assassinated in 1374, Yeom choose to leave the Palace, shaved her hair and became a Buddhist monk. Even so, the court still respect all of the late King Gongmin's widowed consorts and continued to provide their daily necessities until it was stopped in 1388. After this, no records left about Yeom's life.

Relatives
Yeom had:
3 older brothers:
Yeom Guk-bo, Prince Seoseong (염국보 서성군, 廉國寶 瑞城君) – married Lady of the Andong Gwon clan (부인 안동 권씨), daughter of Gwon-Yeom the Prince Hyeonbok (권염 현복군) and had 2 sons and 1 daughter.
Yeom Heung-bang (염흥방, 廉興邦) – married Lady Jo (부인 조씨), daughter of Jo Mun-gyeong (조문경) and had 3 daughters.
Yeom Jeong-Su (염정수, 廉廷秀) – married Lady of the Baecheon Jo clan (부인 배천 조씨), daughter of Jo Deuk-ju (조득주) and had 1 daughter.
3 older sisters:
Lady Yeom (부인 염씨) – married Hong-Jing (홍징, 洪徵) and had 3 sons and 1 daughter.
Lady Yeom (부인 염씨) – married Im-Heon (임헌, 任獻) and had 3 sons and 1 daughter.
Lady Yeom (부인 염씨) – married Jeong Hui-gye (정희계, 鄭煕啓) and had 1 son and 1 daughter.
1 younger sister who married Yi-Song (이송, 李悚) and had 2 sons.

In popular culture
Portrayed by Uhm Hye-Shin in the 2014 KBS TV series Jeong Do-jeon.

References

External links
Sin-Bi Yeom on Naver .
Sin-Bi Yeom on Encykorea .

Royal consorts of the Goryeo Dynasty
Year of birth unknown
Year of death unknown
Paju Yeom clan